Landscape with the Temptation of St Anthony is a 1637 or 1638 painting by Claude Lorrain, now in the Prado Museum in Madrid. It was one of several paintings commissioned from the artist for the palacio del Buen Retiro.

There are multiple other paintings with this title, including 
 Landscape with the Temptation of St Anthony (Savery)

References

1638 paintings
Paintings by Claude Lorrain
Landscape paintings
Paintings of the Museo del Prado by French artists